Wafik El-Deiry (born, 1961) is an American physician and cancer researcher who is the Associate Dean for Oncologic Sciences at the Warren Alpert Medical School, Brown University, Director of the Cancer Center at Brown University, and the Director of the Joint Program in Cancer Biology at Brown University and its affiliated hospitals. He was previously deputy director of Translational Research at Fox Chase Cancer Center, where he was also co-Leader of the Molecular Therapeutics Program.

Career
El-Deiry was formerly a professor of Medicine and Chief of Hematology/Oncology at the Penn State Milton S. Hershey Medical Center. He also served as the associate director for Translational Research and Interim Cancer Center Director at Penn State University. Prior to his tenure at Penn State, he was an investigator in cell biology at the Howard Hughes Medical Institute and a professor of medicine, genetics, and pharmacology at the University of Pennsylvania School of Medicine. While at the University of Pennsylvania, Dr. El-Deiry served as co-Leader of the Radiobiology & Imaging Program at the Abramson Cancer Center and as associate director for Physician-Scientist training in Hematology/Oncology. He held an endowed chair in hematology-oncology while at Penn State University: the Rose Dunlap Division Chair in Hematology-Oncology. At Fox Chase Cancer Center, he holds the William Wikoff Smith Chair in Cancer Research. El-Deiry earned MD and PhD degrees from the University of Miami Miller School of Medicine in 1987 and later delivered the Keynote presentation at the 9th Annual MD/PhD Student Research Symposium. These and other accomplishments are listed in an online CV.

Research
El-Deiry is among the top 40 most-cited researchers of the 1990s, having authored 13 papers that have been cited over 6,000 times. His paper, "WAF1, a potential mediator of p53 tumor suppression", which has been cited over 9,000 times according to Google Scholar, is among the top 10 most-cited papers of the 1990s. El-Deiry discovered the genomic DNA binding site for the tumor suppressor p53. Nikola Pavletich later crystallized the DNA-binding domain of p53 with the DNA binding site and showed that p53 amino acid residues involved in mutations in human cancer normally touch the DNA binding site recognized by the p53 protein. El-Deiry made the discoveries of the consensus binding site for p53 and the discovery of WAF1 while working with Bert Vogelstein at Johns Hopkins University. p21(WAF1) was the first mammalian cell cycle inhibitor to be discovered, and was found independently by Wade Harper and Steve Elledge as a CDK2-interacting protein p21(CIP1), Yue Xiong and David Beach as a cyclin-CDK-PCNA interacting protein (p21), and as a senescence derived inhibitor by Noda. Multiple CDK inhibitors have become approved as cancer therapeutics, including palbociclib, abemaciclib and ribociclib. In 2017, El-Deiry's group discovered a micro-RNA family that inhibits CDK4/6. In 2021, Dr. El-Deiry discussed the discovery of WAF1 in an interview entitled "Persistence. Agility. Cancer Research with Dr. Wafik El-Deiry" for The Medicine Mentors Podcast.

In total, El-Deiry has >83,000 citations and an H-index of 120 according to Google Scholar. He was recognized through an award from the American Cancer Society in 2016.

As an independent investigator at University of Pennsylvania, El-Deiry discovered TRAIL death receptor 5 (DR5) in 1997. His group was first to combine gene silencing with bioluminescence imaging in vivo and to use molecular imaging for drug screening. His group created a knockout mouse of death receptor 5 (DR5) that shows reduced apoptosis in vivo after exposure to gamma-radiation, and increased tumor susceptibility in tumor-prone genetic backgrounds. The mechanism by which cell death occurs in vivo after radiation or other DNA damage has remained an important question that has been studied by Michael B. Kastan, Scott W. Lowe, Karen Vousden, and others. El-Deiry's contribution was to define the role of the extrinsic cell death pathway through p53 regulation of death receptor 5.

El-Deiry worked on drug synergies and discovered a potent cancer therapeutic interaction between TRAIL and sorafenib. In 2013, his group reported a TRAIL-inducing compound TIC10 as a novel cancer therapeutic and dual inhibitor of ERK and Akt. TIC10 (also known as ONC201) could cross the blood-brain barrier and treat glioblastoma brain cancer in mice. Glioblastoma is a difficult to treat cancer with a high mortality rate. ONC201 is being tested in the clinic at Massachusetts General Hospital and New York University with some evidence of response in patients with glioblastoma. By 2016, TIC10 was found to trigger an integrated stress response leading to anti-tumor effects. ONC201/TIC10 is active against cancer stem cells and blocks cancer stem cell gene signatures. ONC201 can bind a subtype of dopamine receptors. Unlike TRAIL which is active against a subset of triple negative breast cancer (TNBC), ONC201 has preclinical anti-tumor efficacy against ER/PR+. Her2+ and TNBC. El-Deiry reported that ONC201 synergizes with TRAIL, and described the discovery in a video interview. Analogues of ONC201, including ONC206 and ONC212 have been described and demonstrate some differential activities as compared to ONC201. ONC212 has preclinical activity in pancreatic cancer, liver cancer and melanoma. In 2021, Dr. El-Deiry was invited to speak about the impact of his research and the development of the Cancer Center at Brown University.

Professional activities
As an American Cancer Society Research Professor, El-Deiry was introduced and spoke at a Relay for Life event in Pennsylvania in 2017.

In 2001, El-Deiry became the Founding Editor-in-Chief of the peer-reviewed journal Cancer Biology and Therapy.

El-Deiry is a member of the F1000 faculty. He serves as a Member of the editorial board of the oncology newspaper HemOnc Today.

In 2005, El-Deiry became a member of the Interurban Clinical Club, and served as its president in 2013–2014. He is also a member of the American Society for Clinical Investigation (1999), the Association of American Physicians (2008), is a Fellow of the American College of Physicians (2012), and a member of the Johns Hopkins University Society of Scholars (2014).

In June, 2015 El-Deiry described the developments in liquid biopsy for the American Association for Cancer Research's blog CancerResearch Catalyst. In August, 2015 El-Deiry gave an interview to Yahoo Lifestyle about former President Carter's melanoma that had spread to his brain. He also spoke with Health News Reporter Ali Gorman at Fox Chase in Philadelphia, Pennsylvania on 8-20-15 regarding President Jimmy Carter's Diagnosis of metastatic melanoma.

In February, 2016 he spoke with U.S. News & World Reportabout targeted cancer therapy for genetic discoveries.  El-Deiry commented for the Washington Post in June, 2016 about the Cancer Moonshot spearheaded by then Vice President Joseph Biden, and organized an event in Philadelphia. El-Deiry advocated for broadening clinical trial enrollment criteria to be more inclusive.

As a medical oncologist El-Deiry specializes in the care of patients with colorectal cancer. His clinical research demonstrated variability in 5-fluorouracil plasma levels in patients with colorectal cancer. El-Deiry showed that pharmacokinetically guided dosing of 5-fluorouracil chemotherapy is associated with lower levels of toxicity among patients with stage II/III as well as stage IV colorectal cancer. Toxicity from chemotherapy is associated with worse quality of life in patients with cancer. In 2017, his group showed that the tumor suppressor protein p53 represses the DPYD gene in 5-fluorouracil-treated cells and that tumor cells with mutated p53 have higher levels of DPYD thereby becoming resistant to 5-fluorouracil. DPYD is involved in the metabolism of 5-fluorouracil and patients with DPD-deficiency have predictable toxicity from 5-fluorouracil. El-Deiry advises adopting a healthy diet including cutting back on pro-inflammatory foods to reduce the risk of colorectal cancer. He discusses in detail and endorses findings that tree nut consumption reduces the risk of recurrence and promotes improved survival in patients with stage III colon cancer. El-Deiry spoke about the benefits of tree nut consumption with a Philadelphia CBS local news station that shared the news. He further argues for the use of CEA as an inexpensive and useful blood-based marker to follow when possible to monitor colorectal cancer disease burden and progress after surgery or chemotherapy. He provides his perspective on the use of maintenance chemotherapy in colorectal cancer.

El-Deiry is the scientific Founder of Oncoceutics.

Personal life
El-Deiry is a husband to wife Evelyn, and father to four kids James, John, Jennifer and Julie.

References

External links
 An interview with Dr Wafik El-Deiry

Living people
University of Pennsylvania faculty
American medical researchers
Egyptian oncologists
Egyptian biologists
Howard Hughes Medical Investigators
1961 births
Brown University faculty
Leonard M. Miller School of Medicine alumni
Fox Chase Cancer Center people